Chintalacheruvu is a village in Guntur district of the Indian state of Andhra Pradesh. It is located in Nuzendla mandal of Narasaraopet revenue division.

Geography 
Chintalacheruvu is located at coordinates 15°57'30.0"N 79°36'57.3"E.

Governance 

Chintalacheruvu gram panchayat is the local self-government of the village. It is divided into wards and each ward is represented by a ward member.

Education 

As per the school information report for the academic year 2018–19, the village has a total of 5 Zilla Parishad/Mandal Parishad schools.

See also 
List of villages in Guntur district

References

External links 

Villages in Guntur district